The Phantom of Venice is the 18th installment in the Nancy Drew point-and-click adventure game series by Her Interactive. The game is available for play on Microsoft Windows platforms. It has an ESRB rating of E for moments of mild violence and peril. Players take on the first-person view of fictional amateur sleuth Nancy Drew and must solve the mystery through interrogation of suspects, solving puzzles, and discovering clues. There are two levels of gameplay, Junior and Senior detective modes, each offering a different difficulty level of puzzles and hints, however neither of these changes affect the actual plot of the game. The game is loosely based on a book of the same name The Phantom of Venice (1985).

Plot
The Italian secret police have called Nancy Drew in to investigate a series of art thefts happening in Venice. The thief has been dressing up in a mask and cape, and the news media have begun to call him "The Phantom" not only because of the way he dresses, but because he leaves behind so few clues. A crime syndicate is actually responsible for the thefts, using commedia dell'arte characters as code names. Nancy is sent to spy on the ring and discover the ringleader of the crimes.

Development

Characters
Nancy Drew - Nancy is an 18-year-old amateur detective from the fictional town of River Heights in the United States. She is the only playable character in the game, which means the player must solve the mystery from her perspective.
Colin Baxter - Colin is an art restorer from Oxford, England. He is restoring the Ca' Nascosta for very little money, even though he's one of the best in his field. He claims to love art and works for near nothing because it is his passion. His job allows him to gain access to valuable artifacts - would he steal the treasures and sell them on the black market?
Margherita Faubourg - Recently widowed, Margherita purchased the Ca' Nascosta to cement her status as a Venetian socialite. Her spending habits may have caused her to fall upon hard times. Would she do anything to stay in her circle of wealthy friends - including stealing and selling priceless artifacts?
Helena Berg - Helena is a journalist from Austria who specializes in reporting high-profile crimes. Ambitious and calculating, Helena is extremely knowledgeable about the failures and successes of crime rings, but is she telling everything she knows, or does she have her own agenda?
Enrico Tazza - Originally a guard for stolen goods, Enrico runs a private club called the Casa dei Giochi, but is it just a front for another crime ring? After all, he has the connections and the knowledge to steal the artifacts, so what's stopping him?
Antonio Fango - The prime suspect in the case, Antonio installed wireless systems in the buildings where the priceless artifacts were stolen. Unfortunately, the authorities have no evidence against him. Is he committing crimes so perfectly that no clues are left behind?

Cast
Nancy Drew - Lani Minella
Helena Berg - Adrienne MacIain
Colin Baxter - Jonah von Spreekin
Margherita Faubourg - Gin Hammond
Enrico Tazza - Bruce Milligan
Ned Nickerson - Scott Carty
Joe Hardy - Rob Jones
Sophia Leporace - Angela Mills
Prudence Rutherford - Simoune Choule
Fausto / Romano the Singing Gondolier - Robert Riedl
Angelo the Singing Gondolier - Andrew Parks
Benito the Singing Gondolier - Bob Love
Bruno the Singing Gondolier - Brandon K. Higa
Raimondo the Singing Gondolier - Robert Scherzer
Timoteo the Singing Gondolier - Tim Burke
Italian Voices - Giuseppe Leporace, Vanja Skoric, Claudio Mazzola

References

2008 video games
Detective video games
Video games based on Nancy Drew
Point-and-click adventure games
Video games developed in the United States
Video games scored by Kevin Manthei
Video games set in Venice
Windows games
Windows-only games
Her Interactive games
Single-player video games
North America-exclusive video games